Sagar (Saugor) is a city, municipal corporation and administrative headquarter in Sagar district of the state of Madhya Pradesh in central India.

Sagar has been selected as one of the hundred Indian cities to be developed as a smart city under Prime Minister Narendra Modi's flagship Smart Cities Mission. It was listed as the  safest city of India in 2018.

History
The ancient Indian kingdom of Chedi had its capital at Suktimati, which was located at Sagar during contemporary times. The history of Sagar District before 1022 A.D. is generally unknown; after that, records are available. Sagar was under the rule of Ahir Rajas and their capital was at Garhpehra. In 1660, Udenshah, founded the present town of Sagar.

After 1735, the city came under the rule of the Peshwas. When Chhatrasal gave a region (subha) to Bajirao, he appointed Govindpant Kher (later Bundele) as an administrator. Govindpant founded the city of Sagar next to the Sagar Lake and made the city as his capital. In 1818, a large part of the Sagar district was ceded by Peshwa Baji Rao II to the British East India Company. Administratively, the position of Sagar and the neighboring territories underwent frequent changes.

The Saugor territory was first placed under the superintendent of Political Affairs of Bundelkhand. Later, in 1820, this area, called the 'Saugor and Nerbudda Territories,' was placed under the administration of an agent to the governor-general. The region fell under the North-Western Province, following its constitution in 1835. In 1842 occurred the Bundela rising, the quelling of which demanded more direct attention by the Governor-General. But the order was restored in the following year, and the Saugor and Nerbudda Territories were again placed under the political control of an Agent named to the Governor-General. The arrangement, however, was not found to be satisfactory, and these territories were once again restored to the North-Western Provinces in 1853. After that in 1861, the Saugor and Nerbudda territories and the Nagpur state formed a Commissioner's Province called Central Provinces.

Geography

Climate
Sagar has humid subtropical climate (Köppen climate classification Cwa) with hot summers, a somewhat cooler monsoon season and cool winters. Very heavy rainfalls in the monsoon season from June to September.

Demographics

As per 2011 Indian Census, Sagar municipal corporation limit had a total population of 274,556, of which 143,425 were males and 131,131 were females. The population within the age group of 0 to 6 years was 32,610. The total number of literates in Sagar was 216,422, which constituted 78.8% of the population with male literacy of 82.6% and female literacy of 74.6%. The effective literacy rate of 7+ population of Sagar was 89.5%, of which male literacy rate was 93.7% and the female literacy rate was 84.8%. The Scheduled Castes and Scheduled Tribes population was 54,432 and 3,052 respectively. Sagar had 52833 households in 2011.

Education
 Dr. Hari Singh Gour University, formerly known as Sagar University, was founded on 18 July 1946 by Hari Singh Gour. It was renamed to Dr. Hari Singh Gour University in February 1983.

Notable people 
 Hari Singh Gour, pleader, jurist, parliamentarian, social reformer, First Vice Chancellor of Delhi University
 Sudha Jain, Indian politician
 Gopal Bhargava, Indian politician
 Govind Namdev, Television and film actor
 Mahendra Mewati, Theatre and film actor
 Mukesh Tiwari, Theatre and film actor
 Virendra Kumar Khatik, Indian politician

See also 
Tehsils of Sagar:

 Khurai
 Shahgarh
 Rahatgarh
 Deori

References

External links 
 

 
Cities and towns in Sagar district
Former capital cities in India
Cities in Bundelkhand
Cities in Madhya Pradesh